A backroad is a secondary type of road usually found in rural areas.

Safety 
Backroads are less safe than other roads, with much higher fatality rates. A 2015 study by TRIP (a national transportation research group) in the United States found that backroads have a traffic fatality rate of 2.18 deaths per 100 million vehicle miles traveled, while the average across all US roads is 0.38. Of all vehicle miles traveled in the United States, 22% are driven on backroads, but 43% of vehicle collisions in 2015 (15,132 out of 35,092) occurred on backroads. In 2015, Texas had the highest number of rural non-interstate traffic deaths at 1,259, with California in second place at 1,219 deaths. Backroads tend to have narrow lanes, limited or non-existent shoulders, inconsistent pavement with gravel patches, sharp curves, steep slopes, and poor visibility. The majority of American backroads were built early in US road history, prior to modern safety standards and vehicle designs.

In the United States  

In North Carolina, where they are also referred to as "blue roads", backroads are one- or two-laned roads off of larger roads such as parkways, and are often constructed of gravel.

In Vermont, the Natural Resources Conservation Service has established a Better Backroads program to help towns and organizations deal with road-related soil erosion problems through grants. Both paved and unpaved backroads are eligible for these grants, which seek to protect water quality from sediment accumulation caused by road and ditch erosion.

Many back-roads in North Carolina were created when the state's rural transportation system began investing in urban factories to relocate to rural areas. This created a system of back-roads that allowed for factories to disperse away from busy urban areas. This was done in the late 1940s under Governor Kerr Scott and was known as the states rural farm-to-market road system. The idea for the farm-to-market road system was to connect farms out in rural areas to the markets in which they sold their produce, which would allow for easy transportation for those who transported their goods to market places. Ultimately these types of roads became state highways or nice quality roads, but the importance of their beginnings is that they began as rural back-roads for agricultural purposes.

Examples

See also
 Road
 Road traffic safety

References

External links
Backroad Maps in Canada

Road infrastructure
Types of roads